The Archers is a British radio soap opera currently originally broadcast on BBC Radio 4, the corporation's main spoken-word channel. Broadcast since 1951, it was famously billed as "an everyday story of country folk" and is now promoted as "a contemporary drama in a rural setting". Having aired over 19,500 episodes, it is the world's longest-running present-day drama by number of episodes.

Five pilot episodes were aired in 1950, and the first episode was broadcast nationally on New Year's Day 1951. A significant show in British popular culture, and with over five million listeners, it is Radio 4's most listened-to non-news programme, and with over one million listeners via the internet, the programme holds the record for BBC Radio online listening figures. In February 2019, a panel of 46 broadcasting industry experts, of which 42 had a professional connection to the BBC, listed The Archers as the second-greatest radio programme of all time. Partly established with the aim towards educating farmers following World War II, The Archers soon became a popular source of entertainment for the population at large, attracting nine million listeners by 1953.

Setting
The Archers is set in the fictional village of Ambridge in the fictional county of Borsetshire, in England. Borsetshire is situated between what are, in reality, the contiguous counties of Worcestershire and Warwickshire, south of Birmingham in The Midlands of England. Ambridge is possibly based on the village of Cutnall Green, though various other villages claim to be the inspiration for Ambridge; The Bull, Ambridge's pub, is modelled on The Old Bull in Inkberrow, whereas Hanbury's St Mary the Virgin is often used as a stand-in for Ambridge's parish church, St Stephen's.

Other fictional villages include Penny Hassett, Loxley Barrett, Darrington, Hollerton, Edgeley, Waterley Cross and Lakey Green. The county town of Borsetshire is Borchester, and the nearest big city is the cathedral city of Felpersham. Felpersham also has a university. Anywhere further from Ambridge may be referred to humorously with comments such as "that's on the other side of Felpersham!", but characters do occasionally venture further: several attended the Countryside Alliance march in London, there have been references to the gay scene in Manchester's Canal Street. There have been scenes set in other places in the United Kingdom and abroad, with some characters residing overseas such as in South Africa and Hungary.

Characters

 The Archers' family farm, Brookfield, combines arable, dairy, beef, and sheep. It is a typical example of mixed farming which has been passed down the generations from Dan, the original farmer, to his son Phil and is now co-owned by Phil and Jill's four children: David, who manages it with his wife Ruth; Shula Hebden-Lloyd, owner of the riding stables, was married to  Alistair, a vet; her twin Kenton, runs the village's only pub with his wife Jolene; and the widowed Elizabeth Pargeter. Jill lives in Brookfield with her son David, his wife Ruth and their children Pip, Josh and Ben, and Pip's daughter, Rosie.
 The Aldridges at Home Farm. Brian, who is portrayed as a money-driven agribusinessman and his late wife Jennifer. They have five children: the two Jennifer brought into their marriage: Adam, a farmer married to chef Ian Craig and Debbie, a farmer based in Hungary; two born into the marriage, Kate with a family abandoned in South Africa, and Alice married to farrier Chris Carter; and university student Ruairi, Brian's son by one of his affairs. The family also includes Kate's daughter Phoebe and Jennifer's sister Lilian.
 The Bridge Farm Archers, Tony and Pat, practise organic farming. Their operations include a farm shop, a farm café, a vegetable box scheme and a dairy. The whole family is involved, Tony and Pat and their children Helen and Tom. They also have five grandchildren: Johnny, the son of their deceased son John; Helen's sons, Henry and Jack, and Tom's twin girls Nova and Seren.
 The Pargetters, a landed gentry family who have to make their stately home, Lower Loxley Hall, pay the bills as a public attraction. The family includes Nigel Pargetter's widow, Elizabeth  Archer, and her twin children, a son, Freddie and a daughter, Lily.
 The Grundys, formerly struggling tenant farmers were brought to prominence in the late 1970s and early 1980s. Initially seen as comic characters, they are now seen as doggedly battling adversity. The family includes Eddie, his wife Clarrie, and their sons Will and Ed.
 The Carters, Neil and Susan. Their son, Chris, is married to Alice Aldridge; their daughter, Emma, has successively married brothers Will and Edward Grundy.
 The Snells; Lynda, married to the long-suffering Robert, is the butt of many jokes, but also an absolute stalwart of village life.

Ambridge

 Arkwright Hall is a large Victorian mansion with a 17th-century atmosphere. The building served as a community centre for many years, containing a soundproofed room and field studies centre. Later it fell into disrepair, but was renovated when Jack Woolley leased the mansion to the Landmark Trust; architect Lewis Carmichael led the restoration of the building to its Victorian splendour.
 Bridge Farm is a  farm previously on Berrow Estate, but now owned by Pat and Tony Archer. The farm became wholly dedicated to organic farming in 1984, in a storyline inspired by a scriptwriter's visit to Brynllys farm in Ceredigion, the home of Rachel's Organic. In 2003, Tom Archer began producing his Bridge Farm pork sausages. In early 2013, the family decided to sell their dairy herd and buy organic milk instead and the following year, Tony Archer bought a small Aberdeen Angus herd.
 Brookfield Farm is a  mixed farm which was managed by Dan Archer and then by his son Phil. After Phil's retirement in 2001, his son David Archer took over.
 Grange Farm was a working farm run by the Grundys until their eviction in 2000.
 Grey Gables, once a country club, is now a luxurious hotel. The late Caroline Sterling bought it with her husband Oliver Sterling. The hotel boasts a pool, spa, health club and a golf course. The hotel was sold in 2022 and is closed while undergoing extensive refurbishment.
 Home Farm is a  farm, by far the largest in Ambridge, owned by the Aldridge family. In recent years, Home Farm expanded into soft fruit and deer farming.
 Lower Loxley Hall is a large 300-year-old country house located just outside Ambridge. It serves primarily as a conference centre. 
 The Bull, the village's only pub, is perhaps the most recognisable structure in Ambridge
 St. Stephen's Church, established in 1281, dates back to Norman times. The church has undergone many changes over the years, including a number of different vicars. The eight bells are rung by a group led by Neil Carter.
 Ambridge still has a village shop and post office, originally thanks to Jack Woolley's philanthropy. The business is now a community shop managed by Susan and run by a team of volunteers.
 Willow Farm is owned by the Tucker family. After Betty's death in 2005, the house was divided to accommodate Roy and his family. The farmland is home to Neil Carter's pigs.

Topicality
Unlike some soap operas, episodes of The Archers portray events taking place on the date of broadcast, allowing many topical subjects to be included. Real-life events which can be readily predicted are often written into the script, such as the annual Oxford Farming Conference and the FIFA World Cup. On some occasions, scenes recorded at these events are planned and edited into episodes shortly before transmission.

More challengingly for the production team, some significant but unforeseen events require scenes to be rewritten and rerecorded at short notice, such as the death of Princess Margaret (particularly poignant because she had appeared as herself on the programme), the World Trade Center attacks, and the 7 July 2005 London bombings. The events and implications of the 2001 foot-and-mouth crisis required many "topical inserts" and the rewriting of several storylines.

In January 2012, Oliver Sterling, owner of Grange Farm, together with his tenant, Ed Grundy, elected to vaccinate the badgers on their farm in an attempt to prevent the spread of bovine tuberculosis. The plotline came within weeks of the government confirming a badger cull trial.

It was announced on 29 March 2020 that the programme would include reference to the COVID-19 pandemic from 4 May onwards.

The death of Queen Elizabeth II on 8 September 2022 was discussed by Lynda Snell and Lilian Bellamy as the first section of the episode broadcast on Sunday 11 September.

Actors
The Archers actors are not held on retainers and usually work on episodes for a few days a month. By the nature of the storylines concentrating on particular groups of characters, in any one week out of a cast of about 60, the episodes include approximately 2030 speaking-characters. Most of the cast do acting work on other projects and can disappear for long periods if they are working on commitments such as films or television series. Tamsin Greig plays Debbie Aldridge and has appeared on many television series such as Green Wing, Love Soup, Black Books and Episodes, so Debbie manages a farm in Hungary and her visits to Ambridge are infrequent. Felicity Jones played Emma Carter from the age of 15 but after a period of studying at Wadham College, Oxford, she gave up the role to move into television and cinema.

Some of the actors, when not playing their characters, earn their money through different jobs altogether: Charlotte Connor, when not playing Susan Carter (credited as Charlotte Martin), works full-time as a senior research psychologist at the Birmingham and Solihull Mental Health Foundation; her office is a short walk from BBC Birmingham, and thus she is able to fit her work around recordings. Meanwhile, Graham Blockey, who plays Robert Snell, worked until 2017 as a full-time general practitioner in Surrey, commuting to and from BBC Birmingham at weekends and on his days off. He kept his role secret from his patients, for fear of losing their respect, until his retirement from medicine in March 2017. Other examples include Felicity Finch (Ruth Archer), who also works as a BBC journalist having travelled on a number of occasions to Afghanistan; and Ian Pepperell (Roy Tucker), who manages a pub in the New Forest.

History
A five-episode pilot series started on Whit Monday, 29 May 1950, and continued throughout that week. It was created by Godfrey Baseley and was broadcast to the English Midlands in the Regional Home Service, as 'a farming Dick Barton'. Recordings were sent to London, and the BBC decided to commission the series for a longer national run. In the five pilots the Archers owned Wimberton Farm, rather than Brookfield. Baseley subsequently edited The Archers for 22 years.

Since 1 January 1951, five 15-minute episodes (since 1998, six 12½-minute episodes) have been transmitted each week, at first on the BBC Light Programme and subsequently on the BBC Home Service (and Radio 4 from 1 October 1967). Early afternoon repeats of the previous evening's episode began on 14 December 1964. The original scriptwriters were Geoffrey Webb and Edward J. Mason, who were also working on the nightly thriller series about the special agent Dick Barton. The popularity of his adventures partly inspired The Archers, which eventually took over Barton's evening slot. At first, however, the national launch placed the serial at the "terrible" time of 11.45 am, but it moved to Dick Barton's former slot of 6.45 pm from 2 April 1951. An omnibus edition of the week's episodes began on 5 January 1952.

Originally produced with collaborative input from the Ministry of Agriculture and Fisheries, The Archers was conceived as a means of disseminating information to farmers and smallholders to help increase productivity in the Postwar era of rationing and food shortages.

The Archers originally centred on the lives of three farmers; Dan Archer, farming efficiently with little cash, Walter Gabriel, farming inefficiently with little cash, and George Fairbrother, a wealthy businessman farming at a loss for tax purposes (which one could do in those days). The programme was hugely successful, winning the National Radio Awards' 'Most entertaining programme of the Year' award jointly with Take It from Here in 1954, and winning the award outright in 1955, in which year the audience was reported to have peaked at 20 million.

In the late 1950s, despite the growth of television and radio's consequent decline, the programme was still claiming 11 million listeners and was also being transmitted in Canada, Australia, and New Zealand. By the mid-1970s, however, the audience for the two daily broadcasts and the weekend omnibus combined was less than three million and in 1976 the BBC Radio Four Review Board twice considered whether or not to axe the programme. The serial's woes at this time were seen to mirror the poor standing of radio drama in general, described as "a failure to fully shake off the conventions of non-realism which had prevailed in the 1940s and 1950s."

Programme chief Jock Gallagher, responsible for The Archers, described these as the serial's "dog days". Sweeping editorial reforms followed, included the introduction of women writers (there had been none before 1975), two of whom, Helen Leadbeater and Margaret Phelan, were credited with giving the programme a new definitive style of writing and content, although some listeners complained about their radical feminism.

In 1980 Julie Burchill commented that the women of Ambridge were no longer stuck with "the gallons of greengage jam old-guard male scriptwriters kept them occupied with for over twenty years"; but were 'into post-natal depression and alcoholism on the way to self-discovery'. By the mid-1980s the Radio Four Review Board noted that scripts, directing and acting was "very good" and sometimes "better than ever". In August 1985 The Listener said that the programme's revival was "sustained by some of the best acting, direction and writing on radio."

Tony Shryane MBE was the programme's producer from 1 January 1951 to 19 January 1979. Vanessa Whitburn was the programme's editor from 1992 till 2013. Whitburn took service leave from March to July 2012, and John Yorke, a former executive producer of EastEnders, came in as acting editor. Yorke's arrival prompted charges that the programme was importing the values of EastEnders to Borsetshire, with fans and commentators complaining that characters were behaving unrealistically simply to generate conflict. This was denied by Yorke, who wrote that he agreed to take over "on one condition – that it stayed exactly as it was and that I didn't have to change anything."

Whitburn was succeeded as editor by Sean O'Connor in September 2013. In September 2016, Huw Kennair-Jones took over as editor though O'Connor continued to oversee the Helen and Rob storyline until its conclusion. Kennair-Jones announced in October 2017 that he was to leave the BBC to work as commissioning editor for ITV. The short tenure of two successive Archers editors led to concerns of a trend of radio drama editing being seen as "training ground" for higher-paid positions in TV. Alison Hindell, the BBC's head of Audio Drama until October 2018, took over as acting editor before and after Kennair-Jones's time in charge. She effectively swapped roles with Jeremy Howe when she succeeded him as the BBC's commissioning editor for drama and fiction and he started as editor of the Archers in late August 2018.

Since 2007, The Archers has been available as a podcast.

Since Easter Sunday 1998, there have been six episodes a week, from Sunday to Friday, broadcast at around 19:03 following the news summary. All except the Friday evening episode are repeated the following day at 14:02. The six episodes are re-run unabridged in the Sunday morning omnibus at 10:00. On Remembrance Sunday, the omnibus edition begins at the earlier time of 09:15.

Death of Grace Archer
One of the most controversial Archers episodes was broadcast on 22 September 1955, coinciding with the launch of the UK's first commercial television station. Phil and Grace Archer had been married just a few months earlier, and their blossoming relationship was the talk of the nation. However, searching for a story which would demonstrate real tragedy among increasingly unconvincing episode cliff-hangers, Godfrey Baseley decided that Grace would have to die. The scripts for the week commencing 19 September 1955 were written, recorded, and broadcast on each day, with an "exercise in topicality" given as the explanation to the cast. On Thursday, listeners heard the sound effects of Grace trying to rescue Midnight, her horse, from a fire in the stable at Brookfield and the crash of a falling timber beam.

Whether the timing of the episode was a deliberate attempt to overshadow the opening night of the BBC's first commercial rival has been debated ever since. It was certainly planned some months in advance, but it may well be that the actual date of the death was changed during the scriptwriting stage to coincide with the launch of Associated-Rediffusion. Deliberate or not, the episode attracted widespread media attention, reported by newspapers around the world.

This controversy has been parodied twice: in "The Bowmans", an episode of the television comedy programme Hancock, and in the play The Killing of Sister George and its 1968 film adaptation. On the 50th anniversary of ITV's launch, Ysanne Churchman, who played Grace, sent them a congratulatory card signed "Grace Archer".

In 1996, William Smethurst recounted a conversation with Baseley in which he reveals his real motivation for killing off Grace Archer: Churchman had been encouraging the other actors to join a trade union.

Longevity
The actor Norman Painting played Phil Archer continuously from the first trial series in 1950 until his death on 29 October 2009. His last Archers performance was recorded just two days before his death, and was broadcast on 22 November. He is cited in Guinness World Records as the longest-serving actor in a single soap opera. Under the pseudonym "Bruno Milna", Painting also wrote around 1,200 complete episodes, which culminated in the 10,000th episode.

June Spencer CBE, who celebrated her 100th birthday in 2019, played Peggy Woolley in the pilot episode and continued in the role until 2022.

Sixtieth anniversary
The Archers reached its 60th anniversary on 1 January 2011 and to mark this achievement, a special half-hour episode was broadcast on Sunday, 2 January, on BBC Radio 4 from 7pm. The episode had been advertised as containing events that would "shake Ambridge to the core". This phrase even gave rise to the initialism #SATTC trending on the website Twitter during that weekend as listeners speculated about what might happen, and then reported their views as the story unfolded.

The main events in the episode were Helen Archer giving birth to her son Henry and Nigel Pargetter falling to his death from the roof of Lower Loxley Hall. This unlikely event provoked interest in the frequency and causes of death in the series. In fact, although the incidence of accidental death and suicide is seven times the national average, the overall mortality rate in Ambridge is almost exactly what would be expected.

The demise of Nigel caused controversy among some listeners, with a number of complaints variously expressing dismay at the death of a popular character, concerns over the manner of the dismissal of the actor, belief that the promise to "shake Ambridge to the core" had been over-hyped, criticism of the credibility of the script (for example, the duration of his plummeting cry caused calculation of the building's height at considerably more than had been imagined); also a perceived unwillingness of the editorial team to engage with these listener complaints.

COVID-19 pandemic
Topical subjects have been added to the script, but this was not possible during the COVID-19 pandemic. Actors were initially recorded in their homes and included references to the pandemic from some of the characters sharing their private thoughts with the listener. From 4 May 2020 to 14 August 2021, the broadcast was reduced to four episodes (Monday - Thursday). Sunday episodes resumed on 15 August 2021.

Due to the COVID-19 pandemic restrictions, weekly programming reduced to four episodes, omitting episodes on Sunday and Friday. The Sunday omnibus was correspondingly reduced in length. After continuing with pre-recorded episodes and repeating some classic episodes, new episodes started that had been recorded remotely, to a mixed reception. On 15 August 2021, the Sunday evening episode resumed regular broadcast, as did the Friday evening episode on 3 June 2022.

Broadcasting in other countries
The Archers has been broadcast in countries outside the UK, in particular in New Zealand from inception until September 1982, when Radio New Zealand decided not to continue purchasing episodes. Arrangements were made for a special episode without the usual closing cliffhanger.

Themes
The programme has tackled many serious, contemporary social issues: rural drug addiction; rape, including rape in marriage; inter-racial relationships; direct action against genetically modified crops and badger culling; family break-ups; and civil partnerships, and a family being threatened by a gang of farm thieves. There has been criticism from conservative commentators, such as Peter Hitchens in 1999 that the series has become a vehicle for liberal and left-wing values and agendas, with characters behaving out of character to achieve those goals. However, one of the show's charms is to make much out of everyday, small concerns, such as the possible closure of the village shop, the loss and rediscovery of a pair of spectacles, competitive marmalade-making, or nonsense such as a 'spile troshing' competition, rather than the large-scale and improbable events that form the plots of many soap operas. Godfrey Baseley was quoted in The Independent as objecting to the homosexuality in the programme, saying "It is disgusting ... It is distasteful because being gay is such a minority interest. Country folk don't do that kind of thing. They have sex the proper way."

According to some of the actors, and confirmed in the writings of Godfrey Baseley, in its early days the show was used as a conduit for educational announcements from the Ministry of Agriculture, one actor reading an announcement almost verbatim to another. Direct involvement of the government ended in 1972. The show has reacted within a day to agricultural emergencies such as outbreaks of foot and mouth disease which affect farmers nationwide when livestock movements are restricted.

Cameo appearances
Many famous people have made cameo appearances on the programme:
 Princess Margaret and the Duke of Westminster appeared in 1984 in connection with a fashion show to commemorate the centenary of the NSPCC.
 Dame Judi Dench made an appearance as the (hitherto usually silent) Pru Forrest in 1989 for the 10,000th episode. Terry Wogan was featured and Esther Rantzen was responsible for the sound effects.
 Radio presenter John Peel appeared as himself in 1991.
 Gardener Alan Titchmarsh judged Ambridge's entries in the National Gardens Scheme open gardens competition in May 2003.
 Radio presenter Chris Moyles appeared in June 2004 as a random customer—and suspected National Pub of the Year judge—in The Bull.
 Comedian Griff Rhys Jones appeared as himself in July 2004, when he was drafted into Lynda's campaign to restore the Cat and Fiddle pub.
 Zandra Rhodes played herself in an episode in September 2006 in connection with a charity fashion show.
 Robert Winston appeared as a fertility specialist consulted by Hayley and Roy Tucker in January and February 2007.
 Mike Gatting appeared in September 2007 at the centre of a misunderstanding between Sid and Jolene Perks during the npower Village Cup final at Lord's Cricket Ground.
 Crime novelist Colin Dexter made a cameo in 2010.
 Camilla, Duchess of Cornwall appeared on 16 February 2011 in connection with the National Osteoporosis Society's 25th anniversary as well as the show's 60th anniversary.
 In 2011, a recording of the show Gardeners' Question Time was followed by a special recording session in which Archers characters, notably Brian Aldridge, took part asking questions of the regular panellists while sitting with the audience.
 Sir Bradley Wiggins appeared in an April 2014 episode, presenting prizes at the Ambridge Sport Relief Rough and Tumble event Challenge.
 Kirstie Allsopp appeared in July 2014 to open the village fete.
 In August 2014, the Pet Shop Boys were last-minute headliners at the music festival Loxfest.
 Anneka Rice has appeared twice in Ambridge; in March 1993 and in March 2016.
 In September 2016, in an hour-long episode concluding a highly publicised storyline in which Helen Titchener had stabbed her abusive husband Rob, some notable names guest starred as jury members, including Dame Eileen Atkins, Catherine Tate and Nigel Havers.
 In August 2021, Jackie Weaver, a council officer in the news, appeared as herself, judging a scarecrow competition in the village, and warning off some protestors.
In August 2022, Toyah Willcox appeared as herself in two episodes, enjoying Bridge Farm cheese at Cotstravaganza festival and buying a piece of Will Grundy's pottery at the Ambridge village fete.
 Others who have made appearances include Britt Ekland, Humphrey Lyttelton (1956), Dame Edna Everage and Antony Gormley (2009).

Theme tune
The theme tune of The Archers is called "Barwick Green" and is a maypole dance from the suite My Native Heath, written in 1924 by the Yorkshire composer Arthur Wood. The Sunday omnibus broadcast of The Archers starts with a more rustic, accordion-arranged rendition by The Yetties. The theme for BBC Radio 4 Extra's The Archers spinoff, Ambridge Extra, is a version arranged by Bellowhead.

A library music recording of Barwick Green was used for the pilot and during the early years of the national version, because a bid by Godfrey Baseley to have a special theme composed had been turned down on the grounds of cost, put at £250–£300. However, once the serial had become undeniably established, a new recording of Barwick Green was authorised and performed by the BBC Midland Light Orchestra on 24 March 1954. This mono recording was also accompanied by four movements entitled "A Village Suite", composed by Kenneth Pakeman to complement Barwick Green. Excerpts from these movements were then used for a time as bridging music between scenes. The 1954 recordings were never made available to the public and their use was restricted even inside the BBC, partly because of an agreement with the Musicians' Union.

In 1992, the theme was re-recorded in stereo, retaining the previous arrangements. The venue was Symphony Hall in Birmingham, the conductor Ron Goodwin, producer David Welsby and the sound mixer Norman McLeod. The slightly different sound mixing and more leisurely tempo reportedly led some listeners to consider the new version inferior, specifically that it lacked "brio", although the BBC publicised the fact that the orchestra contained some of the musicians who had played in the previous recording, including Harold Rich (piano) and Norman Parker (percussion). 

Robert Robinson once compared the tune to "the genteel abandon of a lifelong teetotaller who has suddenly taken to drink".  On April Fool's Day 2004 both The Independent and The Today Programme claimed that BBC executives had commissioned composer Brian Eno to record an electronic version of "Barwick Green" as a replacement for the current theme, while comedian Billy Connolly included in his act the joke that the theme was so typically British that it should be the national anthem of the United Kingdom.

In 2009, comedian Rainer Hersch conducted the Philharmonia Orchestra in a performance of the theme, live from the Royal Festival Hall to a listening BBC Radio 3 audience in an attempt to confuse them. He then went on to show how similar it is to "Montagues and Capulets" – "Dance of the Knights" – from Romeo and Juliet by Sergei Prokofiev, claiming that this was a result of Russian spies going through the BBC's rubbish bins looking for the scripts.

Serious events
At times, a cliffhanger involving the death of a major character or a disaster was marked by the traditional closing theme being replaced by the final dramatic section of Barwick Green involving trombones, cymbals and the closing bars of the signature tune – known as the "doom music" to some fan groups. This tradition has been dropped more recently, with events such as the death of Nigel Pargetter being followed by the normal closing music despite the gravity of the incident. This has irritated some followers, who consider the jollity of the normal segment inappropriate in such circumstances.

A brief extract from The Dream of Gerontius was played following the death of Phil Archer. When John Archer died no music was played.

There was a nod to The Archers in the opening ceremony of the Olympic Games in London on 27 July 2012, where the theme tune was played at the beginning of a segment celebrating British culture: the sound of a radio could be heard being tuned in as Barwick Green was played.

Casting

Current cast

Ambridge Extra
BBC Radio 4 Extra ran an occasional short supplement, Ambridge Extra, between 2011 and 2013, featuring characters away from the Ambridge environs. Series 1 and 2 had 26 episodes and series 3, 4 and 5 had 20. The reason offered for non-renewal was limited resources.

Fan clubs
Two organisations dedicated to the programme were established in the 1990s. Archers Addicts was the official body, run by members of the cast. The club had five thousand members and an online shop where Archers memorabilia was sold under licence. It closed as a club on 31 December 2013 but still has a Facebook page and Twitter feed. Archers Anarchists was formed sometime later, objecting to the "castist" assumptions propagated by the BBC, and claiming that the characters are real.

The usenet newsgroup uk.media.radio.archers (referred to as UMRA by its users, who call themselves umrats) has been running since 1995. Its users include experts on subjects covered by the programme, such as the many aspects of farming, the running of small businesses, bell ringing; lengthy discussions ensue – as well as light-hearted matters, and plot speculation. Various gatherings occur where umrats come together. The first was a series of about ten annual barbecues. The first was attended by Carole Boyd (Lynda Snell). They have included participants from Europe and the Americas. It has nicknames for many of the main Archers characters, such as S'aint for Shula. (There are nicknames for most of the regular characters.) Due perhaps to it being initially more accessible in academia, the discussions can be quite detailed, though UMRA considers itself to be a friendly and welcoming group, where in particular flamewars and the like are not welcome. Despite the general decline of usenet with the advent of trendier media such as Facebook and Twitter, UMRA remains a very active newsgroup compared to many. Its one-time T-shirts and mugs bore the legend (in yellow on "Barwick Green", of course) "An everyday story of internet folk."

The Academic Archers, founded in 2016, is a community of fans who share an academic approach to the programme. It organises an annual conference at which papers are presented which draw on academic expertise along with enjoyment. Papers from these have been published as The Archers in Fact and Fiction: Academic Analyses of Life in Rural Borsetshire (2016, Peter Lang:), Custard, Culverts and Cake (2017, Emerald:  and Gender, Sex and Gossip: Women in The Archers (2019,) The group aims to be "curious, generous and joyful".

DumTeeDum is a weekly podcast about the Archers hosted by Roifield Brown and Jacqueline Bertho. Released every Sunday it features a comprehensive rundown on the last week's Ambridge action. By  February 2023 they had podcasted 568 episodes. As well as a webpage, Dumteedum has, a Facebook Group with 2254 members a Twitter feed with 9,235 followers, and a map of its members. There are two other Archers podcasts, both released on a Sunday weekly - The Cider Shed, and Ambridge on the Couch with Lucy Freeman and Harriet Carmichael. They both have facebook, twitter and other social media sites.  Every Sunday there is a ‘tweet along’ with the omnibus episode during which listeners comment live on the show.

Parallels
In 1994, the BBC World Service began broadcasting in Afghanistan Naway Kor, Naway Jwand ("New Home, New Life") an everyday story of country folk incorporating pieces of useful information. Although the useful information was more likely to concern unexploded land mines and opium addiction than the latest modern farming techniques, the inspiration and model of Naway Kor, Naway Jwand was The Archers, and the initial workshopping with Afghan writers included an Archers scriptwriter. A 1997 study found that listeners to the soap opera were significantly less likely to be injured by a mine than non-listeners.

In Rwanda, the BBC World Service's Rwanda-Rundi service has been broadcasting the Archers-inspired soap opera Urunana ("Hand in Hand") since 1999.

The Archers was the model for the Russian radio soap opera Dom 7, Podyezd 4 ("House 7, Entrance 4"), on which the former UK Prime Minister, Tony Blair, once made a cameo appearance.

Parodies
Tony Hancock starred in the Galton and Simpson spoof "The Bowmans" in an episode of BBC Television's Hancock's Half Hour.

Ned Sherrin produced a short 1973 film called The Cobblers of Umbridge. The cast included Joan Sims, Lance Percival, Roy Kinnear, Derek Griffiths and John Fortune.

John Finnemore's Souvenir Programme has parodied The Archers with its recurring "The Archers Accidentally" sketches; the sketches claim to portray The Archers the way it sounds to people who only listen to the show inadvertently.

The radio series of Dead Ringers has frequently parodied characters from The Archers, including a special edition.

The subtitle was parodied by Bill Tidy in his long-running cartoon of The Cloggies, "an Everyday Saga in the Life of Clog Dancing Folk", which ran in the satirical magazine Private Eye, and later in The Listener.

Books and audiobooks

Reference works
 Forever Ambridge — 25 Years of The Archers (1975) by Norman Painting ASIN B0012UT8XM
 The Book of The Archers (1994) by Patricia Greene, Charles Collingwood and Hedli Niklaus 
 The Archers: The True Story (1996) by William Smethurst 
 The Archers Encyclopaedia (2001) by Joanna Toye and Adrian Flynn , published to coincide with the 50th anniversary of The Archers
 Who's Who in The Archers 2008 by Keri Davies. 
 Who's Who in The Archers 2011 by Graham Harvey. 
 The Archers Miscellany (2010) by Joanna Toye. 
 The Road to Ambridge (2010) by June Spencer. 
 The Archers Archives (2010) by Simon Frith & Chris Arnot. 
 Borsetshire Life (2011). The county magazine.  see borsetshire-life

Novelisations
 The Archers by Jock Gallagher
 Ambridge Summer by Keith Miles (1975). 
 The Archers: To The Victor The Spoils (1988). 
 The Archers: Return to Ambridge (1988). 
 The Archers: Borchester Echoes (1988). 
 The Archers: Omnibus Edition (1988). 
 The Ambridge Chronicles by Joanna Toye
 The Archers 1951–1967: Family Ties (1998). 
 The Archers 1968–1986: Looking For Love (1999). 
 The Archers 1987–2000: Back to the Land (2000). 
 The Archers 1951–1967: Family Ties (1998, audiobook, narrated by Miriam Margolyes). 
 The Archers 1968–1986: Looking For Love (1999, audiobook, narrated by Stella Gonet). 
 The Archers 1987–2000: Back to the Land (2000, audiobook, narrated by Stephanie Cole). 
 In 1975, Tandem published a prequel novel about Ambridge in the early 1900s
 Spring at Brookfield by Brian Hayles (1975).

Published audio episodes
 Vintage Archers
 Vintage Archers: Volume 1 (1988). 
 Vintage Archers: Volume 2 (1988). 
 Vintage Archers: Volume 3 (1998).  (contains several "lost episodes" which have been digitally restored)
 The Archers: The Wedding Jack and Peggy tie the knot
 Vintage Archers: Volumes 1–3 (2001). 
 Ambridge Affairs
 Ambridge Affairs: Love Triangles (2007). 
 Ambridge Affairs: Heartache at Home Farm (2007).

Maps
In addition to books and audiobooks, purported maps of Ambridge and Borsetshire have been published.

Documentaries
An episode of Arena, broadcast on BBC Four on 1 January 2007, focused on The Archers. It was narrated by Stephen Fry and included interviews with current actors and scriptwriters.

See also
 List of longest-serving soap opera actors
 List of radio soaps

References

Further reading
Sanderson, Ian (1998) The Archers Anarchists' A – Z. London: Boxtree  (the author founded the Archers Anarchists in 1995)
 A reflection on the forthcoming 70th anniversary

External links

 

 
British radio soap operas
Radio programs about families
1951 radio programme debuts
BBC Birmingham productions
BBC Radio 4 programmes
BBC Light Programme programmes